Cheer Up! (lit. Sassy, Go Go) is a 2015 South Korean television series starring Jung Eun-ji, Lee Won-keun, Cha Hak-yeon, Ji Soo and Chae Soo-bin. It aired from October 5, 2015 until November 10, 2015 on KBS2 every Monday and Tuesday at 22:00 KST for 12 episodes.

Synopsis
Set at the elite Sevit High School in Seoul, the drama follows the lives of five students as they attempt to survive in a vicious environment where academic elitism takes place. Kang Yeon-doo (Jung Eun-ji) is the leader of outcast street dance club "Real King", a group of students who band together because of their poor academic performance, whereas Kim Yeol (Lee Won-keun) is the President of "Baek Ho", an elite club composed of students from the top 5 percent. When the two clubs are forcibly merged to create a cheerleading squad, the two put their differences aside for the benefit of their clubs. As they go on with their misadventures, many things happen that result in a strong and unbreakable bond. Cheer Up! is a story that aims at ordinary high school students' misadventures including love, heartbreak, pain and friendship.

Cast

Main
Jung Eun-ji as Kang Yeon-doo 
Having positioned 196th out of the 200 students at her school, Yeon-doo is at the bottom of the food chain at her high school and her only friends are her childhood friend Dong-jae and the members of her street dance club "Real King." She dislikes the arrogant and self-centered students at the top percentiles of the school, namely the members of "Baek Ho," but she becomes friends with them after joining the Cheerleading Club and went through things with them. She is loyal, sassy, strong-willed, brave and is willing to put herself at risk to fight against the corruption present in her school.

Lee Won-keun as Kim Yeol 
The President of the "Baek Ho" club and the highest ranking student at Sevit, Yeol is the son of a wealthy father from whom he is estranged. His intelligence also makes him cynical and arrogant. His wit and cleverness allows him to see through the tactics of the scheming adults around him as he exposes them. He begins to like Kang Yeon-doo since she is the person who makes him believe in other people again.

Chae Soo-bin as Kwon Soo-ah
Ranked second place in school and a member of the "Baek Ho" club, her mother pressures her to become first place in her school and get into an Ivy League university. She is focused solely on succeeding in her academia (this is shown when she joins a cheerleading club as an add-on to her academic profile), but fails to realize the importance of friendship and personal bonds between people. This causes her to become lonely, depressed and isolated and it eventually leads her to resort to manipulating the people around her in order to live up to her mother's unreachable expectations. She was good friends with Yeon-doo but after her mother kept pressuring her to be first ranked she went against Yeon-doo multiple times. In the end, she realises her mistake and becomes friends with her again.
 
Cha Hak-yeon as Ha Dong-jae
Yeon-doo's childhood friend and one of her best friends at Sevit High, Dong-jae is a talented basketball player. Due to a traumatic childhood experience (which involves in hurting Yeon-doo), he developed a physical contact phobia. However, after getting kicked out of the basketball team, he joined the cheerleading club as well to accompany Yeon-doo. Although having a childlike mentality, Dong-jae becomes the first person who truly understands Soo-ah's emotional pain.

Ji Soo as Seo Ha-joon 
Although he is in the top 5 percent at his school, Ha-joon has an abusive father who constantly puts pressure on him to do well and resorts to violence when his son is unable to meet his expectations. As a result, he has attempted suicide on more than one occasion. Ha-joon also has anger management issues and considers Kim Yeol his only true friend. He soon considers Yeon-doo as a close friend after she helped him. He later develops feelings for her but at the end they stay good friends.

Supporting

Students
Kim Min-ho as Min Hyo-sik
A member of "Real King" dance club.

Shin Jae-ha as Choi Tae-pyung 
A member of "Baek Ho" cheerleading club.

Kang Min-ah as Park Da-mi
A member of "Real King" dance club.

Park Yoo-na as Kim Kyung-eun
A member of "Real King" dance club.

Ooon as Joon-soo
A member of "Real King" dance club.

Jung Hae-na as Han Jae-young
A member of "Baek Ho" cheerleading club.
 
Kang Gu-reum as Kim Na-yeon
A member of "Baek Ho" cheerleading club.

Son Beom-jun as Cha Seung-woo
 A member of "Real King" dance club.

Faculty
Kim Ji-seok as Yang Tae-bum
In Gyo-jin as Im Soo-yong
Park Hae-mi as Principal Choi Kyung-ran
Lee Mi-do as Nam Jung-a
Gil Hae-yeon as Director Lee

Others
Kim Yeo-jin as Park Sun-young (Yeon Doo's mother)
Go Soo-hee as Choi Hyun-mi (Soo Ah's mother)
Choi Deok-moon as Kim Byung-jae (Yeol's father)
Kim Jae-yong as Hyun-su

Original soundtrack

Ratings

Awards and nominations

References

External links
  
 
 

Korean Broadcasting System television dramas
2015 South Korean television series debuts
2015 South Korean television series endings
South Korean high school television series
Cheerleading television series
South Korean teen dramas
South Korean romance television series
Television series about teenagers
Television series by KeyEast